Tsaritsyno is a Moscow Metro station in Tsaritsyno District, Southern Administrative Okrug, Moscow. It is on the Zamoskvoretskaya line, between Kantemirovskaya and Orekhovo stations.

Tsaritsyno opened on 30 December 1984 as part of an extension but was closed the very next day because of flooding. It reopened on 9 February 1985.

From its opening until November 1990, the station was named Lenino for the Lenino-Dachnoye region. The city renamed the station Tsaritsyno for Tsaritsyno Park, which houses a palace once owned by Catherine the Great.

The stations has been closed since 12 November 2022 due to the reconstruction works.

Design
The station was designed by architects V. Cheremin and A. Vigdorov. It has white marble pillars, walls inlaid with patterns of red, brown, grey and yellow marble and mosaics depicting the achievements of the Soviet science. A mosaic by A. Kuznetsov above the entrance stairs depicts the Moscow skyline.

Notes

References

Moscow Metro stations
Railway stations in Russia opened in 1984
Zamoskvoretskaya Line
Southern Administrative Okrug
Railway stations located underground in Russia